Egyptian handball League  is the premier professional handball league in Egypt, It was founded in 1958, Egyptian handball League which is played under CAHB rules, currently consists of 18 teams, including famous ones like Zamalek SC, Al Ahly SC, Sporting, Gezira SC and Smouha SC. Egyptian handball League was managed by EHF.

Champions
 The complete list of the Egyptian handball champions since 1957:

Republic Handball Championship (1957-1971)

Egyptian Handball Premier League (1972–2006)

Egyptian Handball Professional League (2007–Present)

Total titles won

See also 
 Egyptian Handball Cup

References

Further reading
 
 
 
 
 

Handball competitions in Egypt
Handball